Alejandro "Alex" Calvo García (born 1 January 1972), sometimes known as Jandro, is a Spanish retired footballer who played as a midfielder.

Football career
After unsuccessfully emerging through Real Sociedad's youth ranks and playing with amateurs SD Beasain, Jandro started his professional career with local SD Eibar also in the Basque Country, often playing as a forward. In two seasons of play which were spent in the second division, he amassed totals of 47 games and four goals.

In 1996, aged 24, García joined English club Scunthorpe United. On 29 May 1999, his goal in the play-off final against Leyton Orient secured The Iron promotion to the second level.

Post-retirement
After retiring, Calvo, alongside journalist Íñigo Gurruchaga, wrote a book about his days with Scunthorpe, called Scunthorpe hasta la muerte ("Scunthorpe until I die").

References

External links

1972 births
Living people
People from Ordizia
Spanish footballers
Footballers from the Basque Country (autonomous community)
Association football midfielders
Segunda División players
Segunda División B players
Tercera División players
Real Sociedad B footballers
SD Eibar footballers
English Football League players
Scunthorpe United F.C. players
Spanish expatriate footballers
Expatriate footballers in England
Spanish expatriate sportspeople in England
SD Beasain footballers
Sportspeople from Gipuzkoa